The island of Aruba is one of the constituent countries of the Kingdom of the Netherlands in the southern Caribbean Sea. Aruba has no administrative subdivisions, but, for census purposes, is divided into six districts, each of which has many neighbourhoods within it. Many of these neighbourhoods have names, but are not considered by the Aruban government to be separate political or administrative entities. The capital of Aruba is the city of Oranjestad.

The following is a list of districts in the country of Aruba, with known neighbourhoods and villages listed beneath them.

Districts

References 

Cities
Aruba
 
Aruba